Iggulden  is a surname. Notable people with the surname include:

Conn Iggulden (born 1971), British author
Mike Iggulden (born 1982), Canadian ice hockey player